The 1992 NCAA Division II women's basketball tournament was the 11th annual tournament hosted by the NCAA to determine the national champion of Division II women's  collegiate basketball in the United States.

Delta State defeated defending champions North Dakota State in the championship game, 65–63, claiming the Lady Statesmen's third NCAA Division II national title. It was also Delta State's third title in four seasons.

The championship rounds were contested in Fargo, North Dakota.

Regionals

Great Lakes - Rensselaer, Indiana
Location: Richard Sharf Alumni Fieldhouse Host: Saint Joseph's College

West - Portland, Oregon
Location: PSU Gym Host: Portland State University

North Central - Fargo, North Dakota
Location: Bison Sports Arena Host: North Dakota State University

South Central - Pittsburg, Kansas
Location: John Lance Arena Host: Pittsburg State University

New England - Waltham, Massachusetts
Location: Dana Center Host: Bentley College

East - Johnstown, Pennsylvania
Location: Sports Center Host: University of Pittsburgh at Johnstown

South Atlantic - Norfolk, Virginia
Location: Joseph G. Echols Memorial Hall Host: Norfolk State University

South - Carrollton, Georgia
Location: Health and Physical Education Building Host: University of West Georgia

National Finals - Fargo, North Dakota
Final Four Location: Bison Sports Arena Host: North Dakota State University

All-tournament team
 Leslie McKiernon, Delta State
 LaTanya Patty, Delta State
 Nadine Schmidt, North Dakota State
 Sherri Stemple, Portland State
 Jody Buck, North Dakota State
 Tracie Seymour, Bentley

See also
1992 NCAA Division II men's basketball tournament
1992 NCAA Division I women's basketball tournament
1992 NCAA Division III women's basketball tournament
1992 NAIA Division I women's basketball tournament
1992 NAIA Division II women's basketball tournament

References
 1992 NCAA Division II women's basketball tournament jonfmorse.com

 
NCAA Division II women's basketball tournament
1992 in North Dakota